Vianopolisia is a genus of beetles in the family Cerambycidae, containing the following species:

 Vianopolisia captiosa (Martins & Galileo, 1985)
 Vianopolisia spitzi Lane, 1966

References

Aerenicini